Ustad & the Divas is a compilation album composed by Sandesh Shandilya, which brings three singers, K. S. Chitra, Sunidhi Chauhan, and Shreya Ghoshal, together with Ustad Sultan Khan.

Shreya Ghoshal initially was to sing two songs for Ustad Sultan Khan's album. However, due to time constraints, she had to let go of one, only recording "Leja Leja Re". The video features models Nina Sarkar and Varun Toorkey

Track list

References

Shreya Ghoshal albums
2006 compilation albums
Albums by Indian artists